These are the results of the 2006 IAAF World Athletics Final, which took place in at the Gottlieb-Daimler-Stadion in Stuttgart, Germany between September 9–10.

The year's top seven athletes, based on their points ranking of the 2006 IAAF World Athletics Tour, qualified to compete in each event, with an extra four athletes selected for races of 1500 metres and above. One additional athlete, a wildcard, was allocated to each event by the IAAF and replacement athletes were admitted to replace the qualified athletes that could not attend the final.

Track
Key

100 metres

200 metres

400 metres

800 metres

1500 metres

3000 metres

5000 metres

110/100 metres hurdles

400 metres hurdles

3000 metres steeplechase

Field

High jump

Pole vault

Long jump

Triple jump

Shot put

Ostapchuk, originally third, was retrospectively disqualified due to a failed doping test.

Discus throw

Hammer throw

Javelin throw

References

Results
2006 IAAF World Athletics Final results. IAAF. Retrieved 2018-04-24.
4th IAAF World Athletics Final. IAAF. Retrieved 2018-04-24.

World Athletics Final results
Events at the IAAF World Athletics Final